Ice hockey at the 2006 Winter Olympics was held at the Torino Palasport Olimpico and the Torino Esposizioni in Turin, Italy. The men's competition, held from 15 to 26 February, was won by Sweden, and the women's competition, held from 11 to 20 February, was won by Canada.

Medal summary

Medal table

Medalists

Men's competition

The format was changed from the version used in the 1998 and 2002 tournaments. This format was used in 1992 and 1994, the number of teams was reduced from 14 to 12 and the preliminary and final group stages were combined to form two six-team groups with the top four from each group advancing to the quarterfinals.

These changes had the following effects:
 They increased the number of group games played by the "Super Six", who previously automatically qualified for the final group stage, from three to five.
 They ensured that only four teams from each group would advance to the knock-out stage. This would give the games more meaning.

Qualification

Twelve places were allotted for the men's ice hockey tournament.  The first eight were awarded to the top eight teams in the International Ice Hockey Federation ranking following the 2004 Men's World Ice Hockey Championships.  Those teams were:

Allegations of Sweden throwing a game
Allegations have surfaced of Sweden throwing a game against Slovakia so the Swedes would face Switzerland instead of Canada or the Czech Republic. Shortly before the game, Sweden coach Bengt-Åke Gustafsson was reported to have publicly contemplated tanking in order to avoid those teams, saying about Canada and the Czechs, "One is cholera, the other the plague." During the game itself, one reportedly suspect sequence came when Sweden had an extended five-on-three powerplay with five NHL stars on the ice—Peter Forsberg, Mats Sundin, Daniel Alfredsson, Nicklas Lidström and Fredrik Modin—and failed to put a shot on net. Sports Illustrated writer Michael Farber would say about this particular powerplay, "If the Swedes had passed the puck any more, their next opponent would have been the Washington Generals." "[They] were even afraid to shoot!", Russian coach Vladimir Krikunov said.

As part of a subsequent interview about the championship over five years later, Forsberg was interpreted to insinuate that Sweden lost their preliminary round game against Slovakia on purpose, so as to draw Switzerland as their quarterfinal opponent, rather than Canada or the Czech Republic. Swedish forward Henrik Sedin, who played alongside Forsberg on the 2006 team denied the notion while adding that Forsberg's comments in the interview were misconstrued.

Women's competition

Qualification

The top four teams from the International Ice Hockey Federation world rankings following the 2004 Women's World Ice Hockey Championships qualified automatically.  These teams were Canada, the United States, Finland and Sweden.  Italy also gained a place as it was the host nation.  Russia, Germany, and Switzerland qualified for the last three places through qualification tournaments.

References

 
2006 Winter Olympics events
2006
Olympics
2006